Perdana Botanical Gardens, formerly Perdana Lake Gardens, Lake Gardens and Public Gardens, is Kuala Lumpur's first large-scale recreational park. Measuring , it is located in the heart of the city and established in 1888. The park served as place of refuge from the hustle and bustle of the city during colonial times. It contains large sculpted and manicured gardens and a host of attractions.

History

The colonial-era park was the brainchild of Alfred Venning, the British State Treasurer of Selangor in the late 19th century. In 1888, Venning proposed that a botanical garden be built in the valley of Sungei Bras Bras, and the British Resident Frank Swettenham agreed to the scheme and authorised a small grant from the State funds for the garden.

Venning cleared the area of scrubs and lalang, and planted ornamental flowering trees and shrubs in the garden. The scheme attracted public support, and a leading figure of the Cantonese community, Towkay Chow Ah Yeok, contributed a hundred chempaka and orange trees to the initial planting programme in 1888. An ornamental lake was created by damming up Sungei Bras Bras, which was then named Sydney Lake after Swettenham's wife (the lake is now known as Perdana Lake). The project took nearly ten years to complete, but the garden was formally opened on 13 May 1889, just a year after work began, by the Governor of the Straits Settlements, Sir Cecil Clementi Smith.

The official residence of the then British government representative Frank Swettenham, now known as Carcosa Seri Negara, was located atop a hill here. Venning also created a social club by the lake, the Lake Club (now known as the Royal Lake Club), in 1890. The club, unlike the Selangor Club, was an exclusively European club, and it would dominate the social scene for Europeans in Kuala Lumpur for over half a century.

In 1963, the Malaysian Houses of Parliament was built on the northern fringes of the park.

Naming
The park was initially called Public Gardens but later renamed Lake Gardens. In 1975, it was renamed Taman Tasik Perdana, or the Perdana Lake Gardens, by Tun Abdul Razak. On 28 June 2011, the gardens were renamed again to Perdana Botanical Gardens by Dato' Sri Najib Razak in the first phase of turning the park into a botanical garden.

Location
The garden is located along Jalan Perdana or Venning Road. It is located near the National Museum of Malaysia. The nearest public transportation hub within walking distance is Muzium Negara MRT station.

Places of interest
Among the tourist attractions located here are deer park, Hibiscus garden, Orchid Garden, Kuala Lumpur Bird Park and Kuala Lumpur Butterfly Park.

Gallery

Kuala Lumpur Butterfly Park

Kuala Lumpur Bird Park

References

External links

 Perdana Botanical Garden Official website

1889 establishments in British Malaya
Parks in Kuala Lumpur
Botanical gardens in Malaysia